The Asagni Canal, or Canal d'Asagni, is a navigable canal in Ivory Coast, connecting the Bandama River to the Ébrié Lagoon. It passes through the Assagny National Park.

References 

Bodies of water of Ivory Coast
Geography of Ivory Coast